Aremu Olaiwola Qudus (born 13 November 1993; professionally known as Director K and DK) is a Nigerian music video director. He has worked with artists of several musical genres including  Wizkid, Skepta, Davido, Burna Boy and many others, winning 2020 The Headies Award for best music video of the year.

Early life
Aremu Olaiwola Qudus was born on 13 November 1993, in Lagos State, Nigeria. Hails from Kwara State being born into a polygamous family. He choose to pursue a formal education in Creative Arts at Yaba College of Technology in Lagos.

Career

Director K began his career back in 2015 when he shot a music video out of curiosity with an iPhone.

In 2018, Director K  directed the music video for Case by Nigerian musician, Teni and followed  by directing the music video for Skiibii's hit single Sensima.

In 2019, he co-founded PriorGold Pictures media and production services company focused on music videos, creative visuals, and television.
 
In 2020, Director K directed Wonderful by Burna Boy, and Suzannah by Sauti Sol, which got him two Best Music Video nominations at 2020 Afrimma Awards. He went on to direct "1 Milli" by Davido that won Best Music video at the  2020 The Headies Award.

In 2021 Director K directed the Grammy nominated hit 'Essence' by Wizkid featuring Tems, the first African song to chart the  Billboard Hot 100 and the Billboard Global 200

Videography

Commercials

Awards and nominations

References

1993 births
Living people
Nigerian film directors
Nigerian cinematographers
Nigerian music video directors